Emma Okas Wike (born Emmanuel Okanwene Wike) is a real estate developer and urban planner from Rivers State, Nigeria. He is the founder and principal partner of the firm Emma Wike & Partners.

Education
Wike is a graduate of the Rivers State University of Science and Technology, from where he obtained his diploma in town planning, bachelor's degree in estate management and master's degree in environmental management.

Career
He has over twenty years of experience in real estate management acquired from working for companies such as Sam Oduve & Partners, Knight Frank & Rutley and Alagbe & Partners. He is the founding member and managing partner at Emma Wike & Partners. On 11 June 2015, he became a board member of the Greater Port Harcourt City Development Authority. In April 2016, he rose from publicity secretary to 2nd vice-president of the Nigerian Institution of Estate Surveyors and Valuers.

Fellowships and memberships
 Fellow, Nigerian Institution of Estate Surveyors and Valuers
 Member, International Real Estate Federation 
 Member, International Right of Way Association 
 Member, International Facility Management Association 
 Member, African Real Estate Society

See also
Greater Port Harcourt City Development Authority
Rivers State Ministry of Urban Development

References

External links

Living people
Emma
Rivers State University alumni
Real estate and property developers
Real estate company founders
Nigerian urban planners
Board members of the Greater Port Harcourt City Development Authority
Year of birth missing (living people)